Spider-Man or Spiderman is the nickname of:

Jordan Adams (born 1994), American college basketball player
Hélio Castroneves (born 1975), Brazilian race car driver
Linos Chrysikopoulos (born 1992), Greek basketball player
Jonás Gutiérrez (born 1983), Argentine footballer
Torii Hunter (born 1975), American Major League Baseball player
Andre Rison (born 1967), American retired National Football League player
Arwind Santos (born 1981), Filipino basketball player
Darryl Talley (born 1960), American retired National Football League player
Steve Veltman (born 1969), American former BMX racer
Rubén Xaus (born 1978), Spanish retired motorcycle road racer
Donovan Mitchell (born 1996), American professional basketball player

See also
Walter Zenga (born 1960), Italian retired football goalkeeper and current manager, nicknamed "Uomo Ragno ("Spider-Man")
Alain Robert (born 1962), French rock climber and urban climber nicknamed "the French Spider-Man"
Camilo Villegas (born 1982), Colombian golf player nicknamed "Hombre Araña" ("Spiderman")
Theodore Edward Coneys (1882–1967), American murderer dubbed the "Denver Spiderman"
Mamoudou Gassama (born 1996), French firefighter nicknamed "Spiderman" after he rescued a child dangling from a balcony
Spider (nickname)

Lists of people by nickname